Nathan Ngoy (born 10 June 2003) is a Belgian professional football player who plays for Standard Liège.

Club career 
Nathan Ngoy came through the ranks of the Royal Sporting Club Anderlecht academy, before joining Standard Liège in 2019. Along with fellow defender Allan Delferrière, Mbaye Leye started selecting Ngoy in the professional squad at the end of the 2020–21 season.

He made his professional debut for Standard Liège on 22 May 2021, during the last match of the Division 1A season against Ostende. Despite the 1–3 home loss, Ngoy was among the few bright spot for Standard, playing the whole game as a central defender and stopping several goal occasions from Ostende.

The young defender subsequently signed his first professional contract with the club from Liège, tying him to the Standard until 2024. Appearing as one of the most promising prospect of Belgian football, he entered the 2021–22 season challenging for a place in the professional squad as a center-back, along with other youngster Ameen Al Dakhil.

International career 
Of Congolese descent, Nathan Ngoy is a youth international with Belgium.

References

External links

2003 births
Living people
Belgian footballers
Belgium youth international footballers
Belgian people of Democratic Republic of the Congo descent
Association football defenders
Standard Liège players
Belgian Pro League players
Challenger Pro League players
SL16 FC players